Misbah is a Muslim Arabic name meaning "lamp" or "light". This name has originated from The Qur'an from Ayatu-n-Nur, also known as the Ayat of light, from the following verse:

"God is the Light of the heavens and the earth. The parable of His light is, as it were, that of a niche containing a lamp; the lamp is [enclosed] in glass, the glass [shining] like a radiant star: [a lamp] lit from a blessed tree - an olive-tree that is neither of the east nor of the west the oil whereof [is so bright that it] would well-nigh give light [of itself] even though fire had not touched it: light upon light! God guides unto His light him that wills [to be guided]; and [to this end] God propounds parables unto men, since God [alone] has full knowledge of all things"

In this verse from the Qur'an, it typically means the lantern that shows the way.

Pronunciation
The name Misbah is often pronounced with the "h" silent (no there is a full stop that must be heard, you need hear the breath stopping its flow)

See also
 The Quran

References

Arabic given names